Erythranthe androsacea is a species of monkeyflower known by the common name rockjasmine monkeyflower. It was formerly known as Mimulus androsaceus.

Distribution
It is endemic to California, where its distribution spans between the Coast Ranges north of the San Francisco Bay Area to the Mojave Desert, and the Transverse Ranges and Peninsular Ranges.

It grows in moist or wet areas in many types of habitat.

Description
Erythranthe androsacea is a petite annual herb producing a hair-thin, erect stem just a few centimeters tall. Its herbage is mostly red to greenish in color, the paired tiny leaves sheathing the stem at midpoint. The tubular base of the flower is surrounded by a slightly hairy red calyx of sepals. The flower corolla is pink to reddish-purple with darker spots in the throat, and just a few millimeters long.

References

External links
Jepson Manual Treatment - Mimulus androsaceus
USDA Plants Profile: Mimulus androsaceus
Mimulus androsaceus - Photo gallery

androsacea
Endemic flora of California
Flora of the California desert regions
Natural history of the California chaparral and woodlands
Natural history of the California Coast Ranges
Natural history of the Mojave Desert
Natural history of the Peninsular Ranges
Natural history of the San Francisco Bay Area
Natural history of the Transverse Ranges
Flora without expected TNC conservation status